On 8 April 2000, a V-22 Osprey aircraft operated by the United States Marine Corps crashed during a night training exercise at Marana Regional Airport near Tucson, Arizona. The crash killed all 19 U.S. Marines on board and intensified debate about the reliability of the Osprey.

It was later determined that the aircraft had entered an aerodynamic condition known as vortex ring state, which resulted from a high rate of descent compounded by pilot error. As a result of the investigation findings, the V-22 was subject to further redesign, and eventually entered operational service in 2007.

Accident
On 8 April 2000, a V-22 Osprey being flown by Major Brooks Gruber, and Lieutenant Colonel John Brow was conducting a nighttime training exercise simulating a combatant evacuation at Marana Northwest Regional Airport in Marana, Arizona about twenty miles northwest of Tucson. The V-22 was carrying 15 passengers, all U.S. Marines, and was flying in a formation of four V-22s when the accident occurred. Two of the V-22s in the formation were actually carrying out the exercise while the other two were observing their performance.

As they approached the landing site, the pilots of the mishap V-22 realized they were 2,000 feet above the required descent altitude and reduced power. As Lt. Colonel Brow maneuvered the aircraft to land, the Osprey entered an erratic roll, turning on its back and slamming into the ground nose first. All 19 Marines aboard the aircraft were killed. The second V-22 also made a hard landing but suffered no fatalities.

Investigation

Shortly after the crash an investigation was commissioned to determine its cause. The investigation ruled out most possible causes and narrowed in on the aircraft's rate of descent as the primary cause. Investigators compared the mishap aircraft's actual rate of descent with the V-22 flight manual's required rate of descent and found discrepancies. As the V-22 descended to land it was dropping at 2,000 feet a minute, well above the prescribed 800 feet a minute. The speed caused the aircraft to enter an aerodynamic condition known as vortex ring state. In this condition, a vortex envelops the rotor, causing an aircraft to lose lift, in essence descending in its own downwash.

After two months of investigation by the Marine Corps Judge Advocate General a final report was released which absolved the aircraft itself of any mechanical faults and instead pinned the blame on the exceptionally high rate of descent coupled with human error.

The report read:

After 16 years of the widows fighting the Marine Corps and the V-22 Osprey program stakeholders, both pilots were vindicated when they were cleared of blame for the crash in 2016 by then Deputy Defense Secretary Bob Work.

Aftermath

The crash resulted in a two-month moratorium on V-22 test flights and further postponed its entry into operational military service. The Department of Defense Director of Operational Test and Evaluation wrote a report seven months after the crash stating the Osprey was not "operationally suitable, primarily because of reliability, maintainability, availability, human factors and interoperability issues". and implored more research to be conducted into the Osprey's susceptibility to vortex ring state. Nevertheless, a panel, convened by Secretary of Defense William Cohen to review the V-22 program, recommended its continuance despite many issues with safety and reliability. As a result, the procurement budget was decreased, but the research and development budget was increased. Eight months later, another MV-22 Osprey, conducting training near Jacksonville, North Carolina, crashed, killing 4 Marines.

References 

2000 in Arizona
2000 in military history
Accidents and incidents involving United States Navy and Marine Corps aircraft
Aviation accidents and incidents in Arizona
Aviation accidents and incidents in the United States in 2000
United States Marine Corps in the 20th century